Dome is the self-titled debut studio album by English post-punk band Dome, released in 1980 by record label Dome.

Reception 

Trouser Press wrote: "Dome abandons conventional song form for a hodgepodge of treated instruments and voices, with lurching mechanical noises infrequently keeping a vague beat; melodies fragment under studio manipulation", calling it "eerie".

Track listing 
All songs written by Bruce Gilbert and Graham Lewis unless otherwise indicated.

Personnel 
Credits adapted from liner notes.

Cover Design
 M.J. Collins

Engineering
 Eric Radcliffe
 John Fryer

Dome
 Bruce Gilbert - vocals, guitar, bass, percussion, tape, drums
 Graham Lewis - vocals, guitar, bass, percussion, tape, synthesizer

Additional Musicians
 Angela Conway - vocals on “Cruel When Complete”

References

External links 

 

1980 debut albums
Dome (band) albums